Hoplitis fulgida is a species of bee in the family Megachilidae. It is found in North America.

Subspecies
These two subspecies belong to the species Hoplitis fulgida:
 Hoplitis fulgida fulgida
 Hoplitis fulgida platyura

References

Further reading

 
 

Megachilidae
Articles created by Qbugbot